In mathematics, the Weyl integration formula, introduced by Hermann Weyl, is an integration formula for a compact connected Lie group G in terms of a maximal torus T. Precisely, it says there exists a real-valued continuous function u on T such that for every class function f on G:

Moreover,  is explicitly given as:  where  is the Weyl group determined by T and

the product running over the positive roots of G relative to T. More generally, if  is only a continuous function, then 

The formula can be used to derive the Weyl character formula. (The theory of Verma modules, on the other hand, gives a purely algebraic derivation of the Weyl character formula.)

Derivation 
Consider the map
.

Let  be the quotient space by this W-action.

is a smooth covering with fiber W when it is restricted to regular points.

Here,  since  is a class function. We next compute . For each ,

Now, we can view G as a connected subgroup of an orthogonal group (as it is compact connected) and thus . Hence,

To compute the determinant, we recall that  where  and each  has dimension one.

as each root  has pure imaginary value.

Weyl character formula 

The Weyl character formula is a consequence of the Weyl integral formula as follows. Let

where  is the length of w.
.
To see this, we first note
 
 
The property (1) is precisely (a part of) the orthogonality relations on irreducible characters.

References 

Theodor Bröcker and Tammo tom Dieck, Representations of compact Lie groups, Graduate Texts in Mathematics 98, Springer-Verlag, Berlin, 1995.

Differential geometry